Douar Tarselt "تارسلت " forms part of the commune of Sidi Abdelmoumen in the Chichaoua Province of the Marrakech-Tensift-Al Haouz region of Morocco.

It has a population of around 2000 people, with several sub-douars such as Tagadirt, Ait Brahim, Ait Elkhellad, Ait Mensour, Ibaraghen, Ait Hamou Osaid, Ait Wakha and Ait Bamhemed.

Tarselt is known for the production of natural olive oil.

Populated places in Chichaoua Province
Rural communes of Marrakesh-Safi